Hermann Starheimsæter (born 2 August 1950) is a Norwegian poet and novelist.

He made his literary debut in 1980 with the poetry collection Lungeblæretre. Other books are the collection Knutepunkt from 1988, the short story collection Neslesommarfuglen from 1986, and the novel Som om eg ikkje hugsar from 1997.

He was awarded Mads Wiel Nygaards Endowment in 1990.

References

1950 births
Living people
20th-century Norwegian poets
Norwegian male poets
20th-century Norwegian novelists
21st-century Norwegian novelists
Norwegian male novelists
20th-century Norwegian male writers
21st-century Norwegian male writers